The list of characters from the 2003–2009 My Little Pony animated films and shorts.

The third incarnation of the My Little Pony franchise began in 2003, and is commonly referred to as "G3", as classified by collectors, following earlier lines and television show tie-ins in the 1980s and 1990s. During the early years of the "G3" Toyline, several direct-to-video specials were released, bundled with the toys of the "G3" line. This later gained its first feature length DTV movie titled My Little Pony: A Very Minty Christmas in 2005. This third toy line ended in 2009 with the film My Little Pony: Twinkle Wish Adventure.

The characters were portrayed in the specials as adults, while also having childlike personalities. Usually, all the ponies in the specials like to play; though some have "jobs" and businesses to run.

Mainline Ponies

Earth Ponies

Pegasus Ponies 
The Pegasi are winged ponies. Most speak with a Hawaiian accent except StarSong and Thistle Whistle.

Unicorn Ponies

Related types

Breezies 
The Breezies are small fairy ponies living in Breezy Blossom. These ponies usually have butterfly-like wings and antennae on their heads. Notable ones in the franchise were Tiddly Wink, Tra La La and Zipzee.

Other characters
 Spike—full name, Kenbroath Gilspotten Heathspike—is a small blue dragon with gold-colored ear flaps and underbelly scales, a "mohawk" of pink hair, yellow claws, and short yellow spikes on his tail (which is very ticklish). He is the only male character in the G3 cartoons. First appearing in My Little Pony: The Princess Promenade, he had been in a magic sleep for a thousand years when the ponies first discovered him in a cave under Celebration Castle; his memories from before that time are rather muddled. Spike is friendly and knowledgeable, speaks in a clear and cultured voice, and is seen by the ponies as a source of information and advice.

References

My Little Pony characters
My Little Pony characters animated in the 2000s
My Little Pony characters animated in the 2000s